Sardar Khalid Ibrahim Khan (5 November 1948 – 4 November 2018) was an Azad Kashmiri politician. He was a member of AJK legislative assembly and the President of Jammu Kashmir Peoples Party. 

He was the son of the founder and first president of Azad Kashmir, Sardar Muhammad Ibrahim Khan.

Early life and career
Khalid Ibrahim Khan was born on 5 November 1948 in Kot Mattay Khan near Rawalakot. His family belongs to the Sudhan tribe. Khalid started his political career affiliated with Pakistan Peoples Party in the late 1970s. He was known to be a straightforward
and candid person and did not shy away from having differences with the top leadership of his political party, including with Benazir Bhutto. At times, he paid a political price for it by being ignored by the party's top leadership. As a result, he and his supporters formed their own party by the name of Jammu and Kashmir Peoples Party to contest elections.

Death
Khan died on 4 November 2018, aged 69 from a brain hemorrhage. Among the survivors were his wife, two sons and two daughters.

References

External links
Daily Dhartia JK

1947 births
2018 deaths
Politicians from Azad Kashmir
People from Rawalakot
Pakistan People's Party politicians
Members of the Legislative Assembly of Azad Jammu and Kashmir